This is a list of per capita income for U.S. residents, organized by race and ethnicity and ancestry (as of 2015).

By race and ethnicity
The United States Census has race and ethnicity as defined by the Office of Management and Budget in 1997. The following median per capita income data are retrieved from American Community Survey 2018 1-year estimates. In this survey, the nationwide population is 327,167,439 and the per capita income was US$33,831 in 2018.

By detailed races

Asian
In the 2018 American Community Survey, the following figures regarding detailed Asian races are reported. Other Asian races with code but not reported include: Malaysian (025, 044), Sri Lankan (027, 046), Bhutanese (072, 080), Maldivian (074, 082), Mongolian (075, 083), Okinawan (077, 085), Singaporean (078, 086).

Native Hawaiian and Other Pacific Islander
In the 2018 American Community Survey, the following figures regarding detailed Native Hawaiian and Other Pacific Islander races are reported.

By ancestry

NB: The list of ethnic groups (by ancestry) seems to have been arbitrarily curated, since it excludes many Asian-American ethnic groups whose per capita incomes are significantly higher than those listed below. In addition, the table omits Americans of Native American ancestry as well as Americans of Hispanic or Latino ethnicity.

See also
List of ethnic groups in the United States by household income
List of countries of birth by per capita income in the United States
Racial wage gap in the United States

References

External links
Census site

United States demography-related lists
Income in the United States